Beatrice Kathrin Tomczak (born 28 June 1995) is a Polish-German ice dancer who has represented Hungary in the 2018/2019 season.

Competitive highlights

Hungary

Poland

External links
 
 

Polish female ice dancers
Hungarian female ice dancers
1995 births
Living people
Sportspeople from Łódź